Maccari is an Italian surname. Notable people with the surname include:

Agostino Maccari, Italian astronomer
Cesare Maccari, Italian painter of the nineteenth century
Filippo Maccari (1705–1800), Italian painter and scenic designer
Giacomo Maccari (c. 1700–after 1744), Italian opera composer
Murilo Maccari, Brazilian footballer
Patrick Maccari (born 1951), French slalom canoeist
Ruggero Maccari, Italian screenwriter
Sofía Maccari, Argentine Olympic field hockey player

Italian-language surnames